Kings XI Punjab (KXIP) is a franchise cricket team based in Mohali, India, which plays in the Indian Premier League (IPL). They were one of the eight teams that competed in the 2014 Indian Premier League. They were captained by George Bailey. Kings XI Punjab finished runners-up in the IPL and qualified for the Champions League T20 for the first time.

Indian Premier League

Season standings
Kings XI Punjab finished first in the league stage of IPL 2014.

Match log

Champions League Twenty20

Match log

References

2014 Indian Premier League
Punjab Kings seasons